Ulises Segura Machado (born 23 June 1993) is a Costa Rican professional footballer who played as a midfielder for Deportivo Saprissa and the Costa Rica national team.

Career

Deportivo Saprissa
Including his first season with Deportivo Saprissa, Segura already won 3 titles with the club. Segura appeared 126 times for Saprissa and had 15 goals and 6 assists in his time there.

CS Uruguay de Coronado
Ulises Segura was on loan with Uruguay de Coronado from 2014 to 2015. He scored 3 goals and had 1 assist in his 39 appearances for them.

D.C. United
Segura was acquired by D.C. United on 21 December 2017. On 15 April 2018, Segura scored his first MLS career goal in a 1-0 win against Columbus Crew SC. Segura scored the goal inside 50 seconds making it the third-fastest goal scored in club history. He finished the 2018 season with 2 goals and one assist in 23 appearances.

In 2019, Segura appeared in 33 games, scored 3 goals and contributed two assists for D.C. United.

Austin FC 
Segura was traded to Austin FC in exchange for $150,000 of General Allocation Money on 13 December 2020, ahead of their inaugural season in 2021. Prior to the start of the season, Segura suffered a left knee injury and underwent osteochondral allograft transplantation surgery, causing him to miss the entire 2021 season.  On 25 January 2022, Austin FC announced that it would buyout the remaining portion of Segura's contract freeing up a senior roster spot.

International
Segura made his first senior international appearance in a Copa Centroamericana match against Belize on 15 January 2017, having played the entire match.

Career statistics

Club

International

Personal life 
Segura received his green card in January 2020.

Honours
Saprissa
 Liga FPD: Clausura 2014, Apertura 2015, Apertura 2016

References

External links
 
 

1993 births
Living people
Costa Rican footballers
Association football midfielders
Costa Rica international footballers
Deportivo Saprissa players
D.C. United players
Austin FC players
2017 Copa Centroamericana players
2017 CONCACAF Gold Cup players
Major League Soccer players